Mehmet Boztepe (born 16 January 1988) is a Turkish professional footballer who plays for German Oberliga Niederrhein club MSV Düsseldorf.

Birth and Childhood 
Boztepe was born in 1988 in Elazig. In the same year his father moved to Germany and settled down in Moers. A year later moved Boztepe with his mother and his sister.

Career
He has risen through the ranks from the youth team of Borussia Mönchengladbach. From 2007 Boztepe then played in the second team of the Bundesliga side Borussia Dortmund. With this he rose above 2008 in the newly formed 3. Liga. 
2011 he moved to his native country and signed with the first division Eskisehirspor. After half a year without an assignment, he moved to the second division Elazigspor from his hometown of Elazig. Because of eligibility, which was missing, he joined the Dutch second division FC Emmen. Half a season later, he returned to Germany to sign for Wuppertaler SV. On 17 June 2013, it was announced that Boztepe will move on 1 July 2013 to SSVg Velbert.

On 8 January 2014, Boztepe joined the Turkish 1st division club Adanaspor.

International career
Böztepe plays as an attacking midfielder or a winger. On 15 February 2010 he was nominated for the Turkey national under-21 football team. He was appointed for the Turkmenistan AFC President's Cup.

References

External links
 
 
 Mehmet Boztepe Interview

1988 births
People from Elazığ
Living people
Turkish footballers
Turkey youth international footballers
German footballers
Association football midfielders
Borussia Dortmund II players
Eskişehirspor footballers
Elazığspor footballers
FC Emmen players
Wuppertaler SV players
SSVg Velbert players
Adanaspor footballers
Bandırmaspor footballers
Balıkesirspor footballers
Menemenspor footballers
Sakaryaspor footballers
Regionalliga players
3. Liga players
Eerste Divisie players
TFF First League players
TFF Second League players
Oberliga (football) players
Turkish expatriate footballers
Expatriate footballers in the Netherlands
Turkish expatriate sportspeople in the Netherlands